The Swedish Individual Championship is a competition for Swedish Speedway riders, held each year to determine the Swedish national champion.

Previous winners

Medals classification

See also
History of motorcycle speedway in Sweden

References

Speedway competitions in Sweden
Sweden